Gimme the Power is a 2000 Mexican crime film directed by Fernando Sariñana.

Cast 
 Demián Bichir - Gabriel 
 Cecilia Suárez - Sofía Aguirre
 Luis Felipe Tovar - Comandante Eleuterio 'Elvis' Quijano
 Ximena Sariñana - Valentina
 Rodrigo Murray - Martín

References

External links 

2000 crime films
Mexican crime films
2000s Spanish-language films
2000s Mexican films